Rhythm of Time is an album by Jordan Rudess recorded and released in 2004.

In order to create the album before he went on tour with Dream Theater in 2004, Rudess lived in complete seclusion from the rest of the world for 14 days. With no telephone, e-mail, or other social contact, Rudess only spoke to his family and his personal assistant.

The initial printing run of the United States version of the album contained a bonus CD-ROM section. This section included audio tracks featuring Rudess singing the parts that Kip Winger would later fill in and a video "The Making of 'The Rhythm of Time'."

"Ra" is said to have been inspired by Jordan Rudess' life.

Track listing
All pieces are composed by Jordan Rudess.
"Time Crunch" – 6:30
"Screaming Head" – 7:22
"Insectsamongus" – 9:36
"Beyond Tomorrow" – 9:59
"Bar Hopping with Mr. Picky" – 4:39
"What Four" – 6:53
"Ra" – 7:56
"Tear Before the Rain" – 6:36

Personnel
Jordan Rudess - keyboards
Greg Howe - Guitar (4, 6)
Joe Satriani - Guitar (2, 3)
Steve Morse - Guitar (5, 6)
Vinnie Moore - Guitar (1, 7)
Daniel Jakubovic - Guitar (4)
Dave LaRue - Bass guitar
Rod Morgenstein - drums
Bill Ruyle - Tabla
Kip Winger - vocals on "Beyond Tomorrow" and "Tear Before the Rain"

Production
Arranged and produced by Jordan Rudess
Recorded and engineered by John Huth & Dani Koesterich
Mixed by John Huth
Mastered by Jim Brick

References

2004 albums
Jordan Rudess albums